The Framley Examiner is a parody of a newspaper in a small provincial English town, created as a website and later a book. It is written by Robin Halstead, Jason Hazeley, Alex Morris and Joel Morris.

History 
The Framley Examiner originally began as a website, started in 2001.
Its success then spawned a book The Framley Examiner described on the cover as "the book of the website of the newspaper".
A second book, Historic Framley, was later published, produced in association with Framley Museum.

Its writers are regular contributors to Viz magazine.  The book Bollocks to Alton Towers, published in April 2005, by the same authors, is a non-fiction book unrelated to The Framley Examiner.
The website was last updated on 23 July 2013, but more recent posts have been made to social media accounts.

In May 2020, the Framley Examiner website was updated to reveal the launch of a crowd-funding appeal via Unbound with the aim of publishing the now out-of-print Framley Examiner along with additional, previously unpublished material.

The father of Joel and Alex Morris worked as a local journalist in Chelmsford, Essex, but the group have dismissed any connection of Framley to the town, saying that "It wasn't meant to be targeting one particular rag."

Contributors

Challenger Putney, a bespectacled reporter who enjoys reporting on stories featuring the Framley town council or the Mayor of Framley, William D'Ainty.  He is especially suited to the job, since he lives with the Mayor and his wife.
Katie Blirdsnest, a woman who runs a feature called "The Blirdnest Report" which takes a look at life in and around the Framley area. Her previous reports have included such topics as interviewing the man who swallows the tide to stop it from flooding Framley, and rolling down rubbish heaps with binmen. Her reports often contain the phrase "I couldn't believe my eyes!"
Damiun Clavalier, bored son of international fridge magnate Garuth Clavelier, who writes ridiculous articles in the hope of being sacked.
Adam Wrent, whose photo byline depicts him at the age of four.
Taunton Mishap, whose trademark journalistic style is to miss the point of the story.
Pigshit Nelson, a transgender man who writes unintelligible sport reports.
Bunco Booth, a journalist who is in love with Katie Blirdsnest.
Beaky Coxwain, a possible lesbian who is also in love with Katie Blirdsnest
Ursula Cloybeam, the Examiners petty and vitriolic arts correspondent. Her reviews of local arts include a harsh review of a local school production of Julius Caesar. She is also apparently a member of the local secret society the Wripple Vetivers.
Jesus Chigley, wrote the first article ever published in the Framley Examiner, and spends most of the time reminding his colleagues of this.
Stan Rubbish, the Examiner's darts correspondent.
Bowery Tarpaulin
Pharaoh Clutchstraw, science expert.
Arcady Belvedere, writes about local history that only he seems to remember or care about.
Odgar Cushion (deceased), a reporter of uncertain age who wrote the "We'll Fancy That" column, until his death sometime between 1994 and 2012 when the column was inherited by his son, Odnald.
Arbroath Smokie
Oliver Singultus-Hiccup, motoring reporter.

Places

Framley and district
Framley
Wripple
Codge
Chipney
Batley
The Dungeon Housing Estate, which has more single fathers than there are grains of sand in the mighty desert
Clown
Glibley
Durbiton
Shilillingbury Lillingbury Illingbury On Ingbury
Thoxtoxeter
Effing Sodbury
Ovenly
Bellaire, home of the Bellaire Hillock.
Princes Freshborough (these last two are a reference to the TV show The Fresh Prince of Bel-Air)

St Eyot's and district
St Eyot's, whose historic castle is thought to be the home of Britain's first batman
Slovenly
Urling
Fracton
Clinton
Flapton Nogley
Stanglebridge
Yopney St Oh!
Queff
Gartside Green

Molford and district
Molford
Molford St Gavin
Molford St Malcolm
Molford St Arahim Rhamal
Robot Oak, a utopian village constructed of artificial materials and populated by robots
Ghastley St Matthew
Crème
Tellephant
Strawbury Magma
Diesel Park West

Sockford and district
Sockford holds an annual Vulture Jamboree in which visitors are invited to 'Discover how to Milk Vultures' and could meet Lazenby, Framley's biggest Hedgehog (until he died of prickleworm)
Lessbury Moreborough

Whoft and district
Whoft, which frequently suffered deluges of fluff, and was famous for its annual fete (featuring the 'Kitten in a Bottle' competition) until being completely destroyed by property developers due to a planning error.
Wotten Plodney
Queues Likely
Little Godley, controlled by councillor Haris Paris, who mounted a military coup in late 1994 after someone parked a blue P Reg Mondeo in his allocated parking space.
Chutney
King's Mustard
Clifton James
Steeplecocque

Outlying districts
Carnaby Constable
Cloxted
Rockney
Hazeldean Inchmistress
Billberry Buryborry
Nyth

Running jokes

Professor Arthur Bostrom, who meddles with the fabric of time and space, yet always declares "Experiment successful".  Reference: Arthur Bostrom, actor who played the part of an English policeman in the BBC sitcom 'Allo 'Allo! in the 1980s.
A man named Mr. Hollyhock who is always trying to sell his daughter Josie or her possessions in the classified ads.
The Wripple Vetivers, a local secret society.  They are routinely consulted by the US Treasury about proposed changes to US banknotes.  The US Treasury forgot to do this only once, with grim but unspecified consequences.
Estelle Donne, who has appeared in about a dozen wedding announcements. Reference: Don Estelle, actor best known for his appearance in the BBC sitcom It Ain't Half Hot Mum.
Fluff, which is apparently a mainstay of Whoft's economy.
Mayor William D'Ainty, a flamboyant and possibly insane man who mounts ever more outrageous stunts in order to relieve the tedium of ruling Framley. Reference: the late Billy Dainty, a music hall and television comic
Vince Previous, an unsavoury fellow who frequently places adverts offering various kinds of massage for ladies.
Ianbeale Steeplecocque, MP for the district, whose sole concern is the effect of time travel on the local economy and infrastructure.  Given the continued meddling of Professor Bostrom, his concerns may be justified.  He was recently ousted in a cash for crisps scandal.  Reference: Ian Beale is a character in the BBC soap EastEnders.
A constant desire for a Black and Decker Dinnermate and to go at any length to get one. For example, in one ad: "Fountain of Knowledge, will swap for Elixir of Youth or Black and Decker Dinnermate".  Reference: portable workbench the Black & Decker Workmate.
Framley's twin town, Baden Schleissgarten ASF, and its mayor, Claus Freneddt, occasionally appear in the Examiner. Mayor Freneddt once ordered the Framley council to put up posters saying "your town stinks" across the town.
Roy Newby, a rake magnate who owns most of the shops in the Framley area under the brand of "Newby's of Molford", including the NcNewby's fast food restaurant.

See also	
 List of satirical news websites

References

External links
 The Framley Examiner

Fictional newspapers
Internet properties established in 2001
Online periodicals with defunct print editions
British comedy websites